Philbertia perparva is a species of sea snail, a marine gastropod mollusk in the family Raphitomidae. It occurs in the Western Atlantic.

Description
The length of the shell attains 5.8 mm.

Distribution
This marine species occurs off Northeast Brazil.

References

Raphitomidae
Molluscs of the Atlantic Ocean
Gastropods described in 1881